Manakana is a rural municipality located in the Antanambao Manampotsy District, Atsinanana region of eastern Madagascar.

References

Populated places in Atsinanana